The 1999 Sparkassen Cup doubles was the tennis doubles event of the tenth edition of the Sparkassen Cup; a WTA Tier II tournament held in Leipzig, Germany. Elena Likhovtseva and Ai Sugiyama were the defending champions but were defeated in this year's final by Larisa Neiland and Mary Pierce, 6–1, 6–3.

Seeds

Draw

External links
 1999 Sparkassen Cup Draw 

Sparkassen Cup (tennis)
1999 WTA Tour